Diving competitions at the 2011 Pan American Games in Guadalajara were held from October 26 to October 29, at the Scotiabank Aquatics Center. The winner of each individual event earned their NOC a quota spot to compete at the 2012 Summer Olympics in London, Great Britain.

Medal summary

Medal table

Men's events

Women's events

Schedule
All times are Central Daylight Time (UTC-5).

Qualification summary
The following countries have entered athletes:

See also
Diving at the 2012 Summer Olympics

References 

 
Pan American Games
Events at the 2011 Pan American Games
2011
Diving competitions in Mexico